Simon van der Stel (14 October 1639 – 24 June 1712) was the last commander and first Governor of the Dutch Cape Colony, the settlement at the Cape of Good Hope.

Background 
Simon was the son of Adriaan van der Stel and Maria Lievens, an official of the Dutch East India Company (VOC). Adriaan was appointed the first Dutch governor of Mauritius in 1639. Simon was born at sea while his father was en route to Mauritius to take up his new posting. Adriaan had a long tenure in Mauritius, and Simon spent seven years there.

His mother was Maria Lievens, daughter of a freed Indian slave woman known as Monica of the Coast of Goa, or Monica da Costa. Adriaan's governorship ended after five years, and after a few more years, Adriaan left Mauritius for Dutch Ceylon. Adriaan was murdered in Ceylon and Maria also died. Simon went on to Batavia, capital of the Dutch East Indies, where he remained until he was 20 years old.

Career 
He then went to the United Provinces, where he associated with the most important members of the VOC, such as Willem Six. In 1663 he married Willem's daughter, Johanna Jacoba Six (1645–1700). They had six children. In 1679, he was appointed "Commander" of the VOC's colony at the Cape of Good Hope, through the growing influence of his relative, Joan Huydecoper van Maarsseveen. Simon was involved in making wine in Muiderberg; when he left the country, he handed the vineyards over to Hendrik van Rheede.

Van der Stel and his wife, Johanna Jacoba Six, did not enjoy a very good relationship and her sister Cornelia accompanied her husband to the Cape. Van der Stel never saw his wife again, though he remained devoted to her and frequently sent her money. Johanna Jacoba remained in Holland, and sent the furnishings and works of art required to fit out the governor's residence at Groot Constantia. These included several art works including The Fisherman, an unfinished painting by Simon de Vlieger, which was one of 13 of his works purchased by Jan Cappelle upon his death. The painting came up for sale at the auction of Van der Stel's estate in 1716.

In 1685 he was visited by Hendrik van Rheede with whom he shared in great interest in tropical botany. To prevent competition anywhere else in the world, young cinnamon, cloves and camphor trees were destroyed by the ambitious son of Rijckloff van Goens. In 1685–86, he took part in an expedition to the Copper Mountains, Namaqua, where he made topographic and geographic, botanical and zoological observations. In 1691, the VOC replaced the office of "Commander" with "Governor", and Van der Stel was promoted to the new position. His house, Groot Constantia, was well furnished with fine paintings, including The Fisherman.

Every one of his four sons was at one time or another with him in South Africa. An expedition under Willem de Vlamingh was sent out to look for survivors on islands in the Indian Ocean or on the coast of Western Australia.

Van der Stel retired in 1699, and was succeeded by his son Willem Adriaan van der Stel. In retirement, Simon devoted himself to his estate at Constantia, where he died in 1712. François Valentijn visited Frans at Constantia in March 1714. The estate was split up and sold 1716; the auction took four days and was very well attended.

Legacy 

The town of Stellenbosch (founded in 1679) was named after him and Simon's Town is also named after him, as well as the Simonsberg mountain. An early ship of the South African Navy,  was also named for him, in 1952.

Jean-Jacques Rousseau, in his Discourse on Inequality, refers to Governor Van der Stel by name in a story about a Hottentot raised by the Dutch who chooses to "return to his equals" rather than remain in civilised society. According to Rousseau, Van der Stel himself raised the "Hottentot" from birth "in the principles of the Christian religion and in the practices of European customs". The frontispiece of the Discourse features Van der Stel and the "Hottentot" above the phrase, Il retourne chez ses Egaux.

Widely known for his development of the South African wine industry, Van der Stel was also the first Cape Governor to be of mixed race-origin, a fact that was largely unacknowledged by the Apartheid government.

References

External links 

 

17th-century Dutch colonial governors
17th-century Dutch explorers
1639 births
1712 deaths
Commanders of the Dutch Cape Colony
Dutch emigrants to South Africa
Dutch people of Indian descent
Mauritian politicians of Indian descent
Governors of the Dutch Cape Colony
People born at sea
Early modern Netherlandish cartography